Micromyrtus ciliata is a small spreading shrub in the myrtle family. It is often seen growing to less than half a metre tall, in coastal heathland of poor quality soils derived from sandstone. Small flowers occur from spring to early summer. The specific epithet ciliata refers to a fringe of hairs. This plant first appeared in scientific literature in the year 1797, published by the eminent English botanist James Edward Smith. Since then it has undergone a large number of taxonomic changes.

References

Myrtales of Australia
ciliata
Flora of New South Wales
Flora of South Australia
Flora of Victoria (Australia)